The Telegram Building is a historic building in Portland, Oregon. It was constructed in 1922, several years after The Evening Telegram newspaper had been purchased by John E. and L. R. Wheeler. The Telegram was a newspaper founded in 1877 by Henry L. Pittock; it merged in 1931 with the Portland News, creating the Portland News-Telegram, which ceased publishing in 1939.

The red brick and terra-cotta structure culminates in a colonial-style clock tower.

A major renovation was completed in 2004, renovating the building to accommodate multi-tenant office space. The renovation added two floors of underground parking, office space upstairs, and a penthouse (also office space) behind the clock tower.  The Telegram Building was placed on the National Register of Historic Places in 1994.

References

See also
National Register of Historic Places listings in Southwest Portland, Oregon

1922 establishments in Oregon
Buildings and structures in Portland, Oregon
Colonial Revival architecture in Oregon
Commercial buildings completed in 1922
National Register of Historic Places in Portland, Oregon
Newspaper headquarters in the United States
Southwest Portland, Oregon
Portland Historic Landmarks